Hannah Christine Godfrey (born 17 July 1997) is a professional footballer who plays as a defender for FA Women's Championship club Charlton Athletic and the Scotland national team.

Career
She has previously played for Blackburn Rovers, Manchester City's academy team, the South Alabama Jaguars and Pensacola FC, and joined Tottenham in July 2019. Godfrey made her international debut for Scotland on 8 November 2019, scoring in a 5–0 win over Albania. She was eligible to represent Scotland as her mother was born in Glasgow.

Godfrey was released by Tottenham on 25 May 2021.

Career statistics

International appearances

International goals
As of 8 November 2019. Scores and results list Scotland's goal tally first.

References

External links
 

1997 births
Living people
Scottish women's footballers
Scotland women's international footballers
People from Thornton-Cleveleys
English women's footballers
Expatriate women's soccer players in the United States
Tottenham Hotspur F.C. Women players
Women's Super League players
Women's association football central defenders
FA Women's National League players
Women's Premier Soccer League players
Blackburn Rovers L.F.C. players
University of South Alabama alumni
English people of Scottish descent
Sportspeople from Lancashire
South Alabama Jaguars women's soccer players
Charlton Athletic W.F.C. players
Women's Championship (England) players
Scottish expatriate women's footballers